Thirty Minutes Worth is a British television comedy sketch show which aired on ITV in three series during 1972 and 1973. It was created as vehicle for the comedian Harry Worth. Following the series he went on to appear in the 1974 sitcom My Name Is Harry Worth, also produced by Thames Television at Teddington Studios.

Cast
Starring Harry Worth, it also featured a variety of other actors appearing in either single or multiple episodes including Tim Wylton, Trevor Bannister, Glynn Edwards, Patsy Rowlands, Joyce Carey, Geoffrey Lumsden, Tony Selby, George Moon, Hugh Paddick, Glyn Houston, John Barron, Paula Wilcox, Meredith Edwards, Barbara Flynn, Derek Francis, Sam Kydd, Philip Madoc, Julian Orchard, Bob Todd, Richard Wilson, Norman Bird, Pamela Cundell, Marianne Stone, Robert Raglan and Frank Thornton.

References

Bibliography
 Vahimagi, Tise . British Television: An Illustrated Guide. Oxford University Press, 1996.

External links
 

ITV sketch shows
1972 British television series debuts
1973 British television series endings
1970s British comedy television series
English-language television shows
Television shows produced by Thames Television
Television shows shot at Teddington Studios